Ewoud Vromant (born 15 July 1984) is a Belgian road and track cyclist who is active in para-cycling.

Biography
At the end of 2012, Vromant was diagnosed with cancer in his right leg. It was amputated in 2013.

In 2015, Vromant won the 100 and 200 meters at the Belgian Athletics Championships. In 2016, he won the relay at the Belgian Athletics Championship, took silver in the 50-meter freestyle and bronze in the 100-meter freestyle at the Belgian Swimming Championship and bronze in the road race at the Belgian Cycling Championship.

Since 2017, he has focused on cycling. In 2020, Vromant won the pursuit at the World Track Cycling Para-Cycling Championships in Milton, Ontario, Canada. In 2021, he won bronze at the UCI Para-cycling Road World Championships and finished fourth in the time trial at the World G Cycling Championships in Cascais, Portugal. In July 2022, Vromant set a new UCI hour record for C2 paracyling, with a distance of 46.521 kilometers.

References 

1984 births
Living people
Belgian male cyclists
Cyclists at the 2020 Summer Paralympics
Medalists at the 2020 Summer Paralympics
Paralympic silver medalists for Belgium
Paralympic medalists in cycling
20th-century Belgian people
21st-century Belgian people